Coxquihui is a municipality in Veracruz, Mexico. It is located in montane central zone of the state, about 95 km from state capital Xalapa. It has a surface of 86.37 km2.

The municipality is delimited to the north by Chumatlan, to the east by Espinal, to the south by Zozocolco de Hidalgo, to the south-west by Puebla State and to the west by Mecatlán.

It produces principally maize, beans and chili pepper.

A celebration in honor of San Mateo, patron of the town, takes place in September.

The weather in Coxquihui is warm-medium all year with rains in summer and autumn.

References

External links
  Municipal Official webpage
  Municipal Official Information

Municipalities of Veracruz